Arbail Shivaram Hebbar is an Indian politician who is the Minister of the Labour Department of Karnataka since 6 February 2020.  He was elected to the Karnataka Legislative Assembly from Yellapura in the 2018 Karnataka Legislative Assembly election as a member of the Indian National Congress but switched to Bharatiya Janata Party in 2019 and won the by-elections in December 2019.

Early life

Hebbar was born and brought up in the Uttara Kannada district of the southern small village called Shivakar on the banks of river Gangavati in the Indian state of Karnataka.

Political career

In 1983, he was elected to Yellapur APMC and this was his maiden entry to public life. In 2008, he contested the Yellapur-Mundgod Assembly elections as a Congress candidate against V S Patil but lost.

References

1957 births
Living people
Janata Dal (Secular) politicians
Bharatiya Janata Party politicians from Karnataka
Indian National Congress politicians from Karnataka
People from Uttara Kannada
Karnataka MLAs 2018–2023